The 1995 Temple Owls football team represented Temple University in the 1995 NCAA Division I-A football season as a member of the Big East Conference. They were led by third-year head coach Ron Dickerson. The Owls played their home games at Veterans Stadium in Philadelphia, Pennsylvania. They finished the season 1–10 overall and 1–6 in Big East play to place fifth.

Schedule

Game summaries

Kansas State

West Virginia

Penn State

Bowling Green

Syracuse

Pitt

East Carolina

Miami (FL)

Boston College

Virginia Tech

Rutgers

References

Temple
Temple Owls football seasons
Temple Owls football